Sadie Delaney may refer to:

Sadie Peterson Delaney, African-American librarian and bibliophile
Sadie Delany, (born Sarah Louise Delaney) African-American educator and civil rights pioneer